Estakhr (also known as Qal‘eh Estakhr, Esţarkh, and Istlāk) is a village in Kahshang Rural District, in the Central District of Birjand County, South Khorasan Province, Iran. At the 2016 census, its population was 63, in 23 families.

References 

Populated places in Birjand County